Pallavaraiyan was a title used by various officials in the Chola and Pandya governments in the medieval period. It was borne by persons from different communities like Bhoja, Chalukya, etc. and does not imply a relation to the erstwhile Pallava dynasty.

For example, we have a Perundaram (high dignitary) Irayiravan Pallavarayan who bore the titles Mummudisola-Posan and Uttama Chola Pallavaraiyan at different times. This officer belonged to the family of Bhoja. Usually the Pallavaraiyan title was assumed by various officials along with the surname of the king like Arumori-Pallavaraiyan, Uttama Chola-Pallavaraiyan, SundaraPandya-Pallavaraiyan, etc. Also the Pallavarayar rulers of Pudukkottai belongs to Kallar (caste) lineage.

We also have instances where persons from the Chalukya family held this title. For example, during the reign of Vikrama Chola, there is mention of an official called Tirumambalam-Surri alias Munaiyadaraiya-Pallavaraiyan described as a Chalukki of Tondaimandalam and a resident of Anaiveri in Virudarajabhayankara valanadu.

See also 
Raghunatha Pallavarayar

References 

Indian surnames
Titles in India